The firm of Stillfried & Andersen, also known as the Japan Photographic Association, was a photographic studio founded by Baron Raimund von Stillfried and Hermann Andersen that operated in Yokohama, Japan between 1876 and 1885. The studio is noted for its portraits and landscapes that were often hand-coloured and presented in bound albums. The firm also produced photographic prints from negatives by Felice Beato.

History
After at least two visits to Japan in the early to mid-1860s, Austrian photographer and nobleman Baron Raimund von Stillfried became a resident of Yokohama in 1868, where it is believed he learned photography from Felice Beato. In 1871, he established his own photographic studio, called Stillfried & Co.. In 1875, Hermann Andersen was listed as an employee of Stillfried & Co. but by 1876, Andersen had formed a partnership with Stillfried and so the firm was renamed Stillfried & Andersen. Another incarnation of the firm was the Japan Photographic Association, under which name it was listed in 1875. Until 1885 the firm operated under both names interchangeably.

In 1877, Stillfried & Andersen purchased the studio and stock of Felice Beato and in the same year or shortly thereafter published Views and Costumes of Japan, which included photographs by Beato and Stillfried, as well as reprints of some of Beato's works.

The partnership between Stillfried and Andersen was legally dissolved in 1878, though Andersen continued to run the studio under the same name of Stillfried & Andersen. In the subsequent years a number of legal battles and other entanglements ensued between the two, also involving Stillfried's brother, Franz von Stillfried. Around 1885, Kusakabe Kimbei obtained a quantity of Stillfried's original negatives, which Kusakabe included in some of his albums in the late 1880s and the 1890s. The firm of Stillfried & Andersen was finally bought by Adolfo Farsari in 1885, by which point neither Stillfried nor Andersen was resident in Japan. Farsari held the bulk of the firm's negatives, only for them to be destroyed in a fire in 1886 along with all of Adolfo Farsari's own stock.

Collections
Stillfried & Andersen photographs can be found in:
 the Royal Collection Trust, United Kingdom
the Canadian Centre for Architecture, Montreal
 the Museé Guimet, Paris.

Notes

References

 Clark, John. Japanese Exchanges in Art, 1850s to 1930s with Britain, continental Europe, and the USA: Papers and Research Materials (Sydney: Power Publications, 2001).
 Dobson, Sebastian. "Yokohama Shashin". In Art & Artifice: Japanese Photographs of the Meiji Era – Selections from the Jean S. and Frederic A. Sharf Collection at the Museum of Fine Arts, Boston (Boston: MFA Publications, 2004), 15-28, 37.
 Edel, Chantal. Mukashi, Mukashi: Le Japon de Pierre Loti, photographies par Beato et Stillfried (Paris: Arthaud, 1984), 15.
 Gartlan, Luke. "A Chronology of Baron Raimund von Stillfried-Ratenicz (1839-1911)". In Japanese Exchanges in Art, 1850s to 1930s with Britain, continental Europe, and the USA: Papers and Research Materials (Sydney: Power Publications, 2001), 125-.
Gartlan, Luke. A career of Japan : Baron Raimund von Stillfried and early Yokohama Photography (Leiden, The Netherlands : Brill, 2016).
 Handy, Ellen. "Tradition, Novelty, and Invention: Portrait and Landscape Photography in Japan, 1860s-1880s". In A Timely Encounter: Nineteenth-Century Photographs of Japan (ex. cat.; Cambridge, Massachusetts: Peabody Museum Press, 1988), 57.
 Rosenberg, Gert. Wilhelm Burger: Ein Welt- und Forschungsreisender mit der Kamera: 1844-1920 (Vienna: Christian Brandstätter, 1984), 25-26.
 Rosenblum, Naomi. A World History of Photography (New York: Abbeville Press, 1984), 172.
 Turner, Jane, ed. The Dictionary of Art, vol. 29 (New York: Grove, 1996), 663.

Portrait photographers
Photographic studios
19th-century photographers
Photography companies of Japan